Ian Turnbull Ker (30 August 1942 – 5 November 2022) was an English Roman Catholic priest, a former Anglican and a scholar and author. He was generally regarded as the world's authority on John Henry Newman, on whom he published more than 20 books.

Ker taught theology at Oxford University, where he was a senior research fellow at Blackfriars, Oxford, and a member of the Faculty of Theology. He taught both English literature and theology at universities in the UK and USA. Ker was regarded as the leading authority on Saint John Henry Newman, on whom he published the universally acknowledged definitive biography. He was the author of The Catholic Revival in English Literature 1845-1961, Mere Catholicism, and G.K. Chesterton: A Biography. On this last book, the late Christopher Hitchens reviewed that "Professor Ker's spirited and double-barreled attempt at a rehabilitation" of Chesterton "is enjoyable in its own right."

Ker died on 5 November 2022, in Gloucester, at the age of 80.

Selected bibliography
A selected bibliography of Ker's books sorted by year of first publication:
 1990. "John Henry Newman: A biography". Oxford University Press .
 2003. "The Catholic Revival in English Literature 1845-1961". Notre Dame Press USA. . 
 2007. "Mere Catholicism". Emmaus Road Publishing. .
 2012. "GK Chesterton: A biography". Oxford University Press. .
 2010. John Henry Newman. Una biografía. (Spanish edition) Ediciones Palabra.

References

External links
 Interview Salt & Light TV, Toronto (Canada)
 Oxford University Newman Society
 Podcast of lecture - Newman's idea of a university: some misunderstandings

1942 births
2022 deaths
20th-century English Roman Catholic priests
21st-century English Roman Catholic priests
Converts to Roman Catholicism from Anglicanism